This is a list of episodes from the fifth season of Alice.

Episodes

Broadcast history
The season originally aired Sundays at 9:00-9:30 pm (EST).

References

1980 American television seasons
1981 American television seasons